This is a list of head men's basketball coaches at San Jose State University. 

San Jose State Spartans men's basketball coaches